Aristoceras is a Late Paleozoic goniatitid genus included in the Goniatitina suborder in which the lobes of the external suture are irregularly serrate.

Aristoceras, named by Ruzencev, 1950, may be a synonym for Euthalassoceras Miller and Furnish, 1940.  The family to which it belongs, the Thalassoceratidae is now part of the Thalassoceratoidea, but used to be included in the Dimorphocerataceae with the Dimorphoceratidae.

References

 
Aristoceras in GONIAT 6/9/12

Fossils of Kazakhstan
Goniatitida genera
Thalassoceratoidea
Permian ammonites
Pennsylvanian first appearances
Cisuralian genus extinctions